Ermengarde  (or Irmingard) of Hesbaye (c. 778 – 3 October 818), probably a member of the Robertian dynasty, was Carolingian empress from 813 and Queen of the Franks from 814 until her death as the wife of the Carolingian emperor Louis the Pious.

Life
Ermengarde was the daughter of Count Ingerman of Hesbaye and Rotrude.

About 794 Ermengarde married Louis the Pious, son of Charlemagne, who since 781 ruled as a King of Aquitaine. He had already fathered two children, and Ermengarde may have been his concubine. Ermengarde gave birth to six children:  
 Lothair I (795–855), born in Altdorf, Bavaria
 Pepin I of Aquitaine (797–838) 
 Adelaide, born c. 799
 Rotrude, born about 800, married Gerard, Count of Auvergne (c. 800 –  d. 25 June 841) and they had Ranulf I of Poitiers.
 Hildegard/Matilda, born  c. 802, abbess of Notre-Dame in Laon
 Louis the German (c. 805–876), King of East Francia

Charlemagne initially intended to divide his Carolingian Empire between Louis and his brothers Pepin and Charles, who nevertheless died in quick succession in 810/11. On 10 September 813, Charlemagne designated Louis his successor and had him proclaimed co-emperor. Ermengarde's husband became sole emperor and king of the Franks upon his father's death on 28 January 814. The couple was anointed and crowned emperor and empress by Pope Stephen IV on 5 October 816 in Reims Cathedral.

She died at Angers, Neustria (in present-day France) on 3 October 818. A few years after her death, her husband remarried to Judith of Bavaria, who bore him Charles the Bald.

References

Sources

|-

770s births
818 deaths
Year of birth uncertain
Frankish queens consort
Holy Roman Empresses
Women from the Carolingian Empire
8th-century Frankish nobility
8th-century Frankish women
9th-century French women